The enzyme R-linalool synthase (EC 4.2.3.26)  catalyzes the chemical reaction

geranyl diphosphate + H2O  (3R)-linalool + diphosphate

This enzyme belongs to the family of lyases, specifically those carbon-oxygen lyases acting on phosphates.  The systematic name of this enzyme class is geranyl-diphosphate diphosphate-lyase [(3R)-linalool-forming]. Other names in common use include (3R)-linalool synthase, and (−)-3R-linalool synthase.

References

 
 

EC 4.2.3
Enzymes of unknown structure